The Peach Belt Conference men's basketball tournament is the annual conference basketball championship tournament for the Peach Belt Conference. The tournament has been held annually since 1992. It is a single-elimination tournament and seeding is based on regular season records.

The winner, declared conference champion, receives the conference's automatic bid to the NCAA Men's Division II Basketball Championship.

Results

Championship records

 Georgia Southwestern, North Georgia, USC Beaufort, and Young Harris have not yet won the Peach Belt tournament.
Francis Marion and North Florida never won the tournament as Peach Belt members.
 Schools highlighted in pink are former members of the Peach Belt Conference

See also
 Peach Belt Conference women's basketball tournament

References

NCAA Division II men's basketball conference tournaments
Tournament
Recurring sporting events established in 1992